The 2008 Cachantún Cup was a women's tennis tournament played on outdoor clay courts. It was the first and only edition of the Cachantún Cup, and was part of the Tier III Series of the 2008 WTA Tour. It took place in Viña del Mar, Chile, on 11–17 February 2008. Flavia Pennetta won the singles title.

Champions

Singles

 Flavia Pennetta defeated  Klára Zakopalová, 6–4, 5–4 retired
 It was Flavia Pennetta's first title of the year, and her fifth overall.

Doubles

 Līga Dekmeijere /  Alicja Rosolska defeated  Mariya Koryttseva /  Julia Schruff, 7–5, 6–3

External links
 Official website
 Singles, Doubles and Qualifying Singles Draws

Cachantun Cup